Drexel Hill Junction (also known as Shadeland Avenue) is a SEPTA Media-Sharon Hill Trolley Line station in Drexel Hill, Pennsylvania. It is located near Hillcrest Road and Shadeland Avenue, and serves both Routes 101 and 102. Drexel Hill Junction is the last stop where Routes 101 and 102 share the same right-of-way.

Trolleys arriving at this station travel between 69th Street Terminal in Upper Darby, Pennsylvania and either Orange Street in Media, Pennsylvania for the Route 101 line, or Sharon Hill, Pennsylvania for the Route 102 line. The station has 2 covered sheds where people can go inside when it is raining. It serves as a stop for both local and express lines. The tracks split between Shadeland and Turner Avenues. A storage track exists between the wye that terminates across from the intersection of Turner and Berry Avenues. No parking is available at this station, and bus connections are limited.

The sheds include an original P&W-era stone shelter on the southeast corner of Shadeland Avenue with a heavy gabled roof and green window frames with no glass. The shelter on the northeast corner of Shadeland Avenue is a square green stucco shelter with both an enclosed and open area, and an angled-roof tilting slightly down towards Hillcrest Road.

Station layout

External links

Drexel Hill; Media/Sharon Hill (Kavanaugh Transit Systems)
 Station from Google Maps Street View

SEPTA Media–Sharon Hill Line stations